IMACS or Imacs can refer to:

 International Master in Cinema Studies, a network of European and American research universities delivering a common program in film studies
 International Association for Mathematics and Computers in Simulation, a Belgian-American network for researchers on simulation